The Pfadfinderinnenschaft Sankt Georg (PSG) is a German Roman Catholic Girl Scout regionally coed association with about 10,000 members. The national association is a full member of the Ring Deutscher Pfadfinderinnenverbände and the World Association of Girl Guides and Girl Scouts (WAGGGS). Founded in 1931 and restarted in 1947, WAGGGS membership was attained in 1950.  It is also a member of the International Catholic Conference of Scouting (ICCS) and of the Bund der Deutschen Katholischen Jugend (BDKJ).  There is also a parallel Scouting organization with strong ties to the PSG, the Deutsche Pfadfinderschaft Sankt Georg.

References

http://www.psg-bundesverband.de/

Scouting and Guiding in Germany